The Life and works of Hungarian writers (in Hungarian Magyar írók élete és munkái) is a lexicon of Hungarian literature written at the turn of the century by József Szinnyei. The 14-volume work, published between 1891 and 1914, sought to bring together all those who had published a literary work published (or left in manuscript) in their hands. The life and work of Hungarian writers is still a masterpiece and one of the greatest simple literary works.

The concept 
After 30 years of research (1860–1890), the author published a huge work of about 5,200 pages in 24 years (1891–1914), processing the biographies and works of nearly 30,000 Hungarian writers in a broader sense – that is, not only people and poets who create works of fiction. With the exception of Pál Gulyás' later (unfinished) supplementary series (The Life and Works of Hungarian Writers – New Series), it is still the largest and most detailed scientific work in its field.

From the old Hungarian (national) authors to his contemporaries, his extensive attention to everyone. Including publishers in foreign languages (Latin, German, Slovak, Romanian, etc.), ethnic and "Hungarianized" authors. Due to the conditions of the age and the author's career, all this must be understood within the broad framework of historical Hungary (Greater Hungary).

History 
Szinnyei was a significant bibliographer and librarian of the second half of the 19th century, who, from a young age of 1860, collected the data for the design of a hopeful great Hungarian literary lexicon. By 1877, such a large amount of material had been collected that Szinnyei submitted his application to the Hungarian Academy of Sciences in connection with his work. The Academy postponed the publication due to financial problems, and it was not until after Szinnyei's further application in 1885 and 1886 that he decided on financial support in 1889, but did not undertake to publish the work.

The author finally signed a contract with the academic bookstore of Viktor Hornyánszky, and the first booklets of the first volume may have been published as early as 1890. By this time Szinnyei was already 60 years old, but with almost renewed vigor he began to settle his notes. The full series eventually appeared in 14 volumes in 24 years. The author did not reach the end of the main work of his life: he died in 1913 at the age of 83. The last volume was published only one year after his death, in 1914, with the help of his son, Ferenc Szinnyei.

Description 

In the lexicon, the author collected the biographical and literary data of 29,553 Hungarian writers in a broader sense (ie not only fiction writers) on about 10,500 columns, ie about 5,250 two-column pages. The various name variations / changes, resp. due to misspellings and other errors, the number of people involved is a few hundred smaller.

He spoke more about the more famous writers, narrowing down the biographical data of those classified as less significant, but paying close attention to the completeness of the titles of their independently published works. He developed his biographies in the same process: he published the most important events of the writers' careers, listed their journal and newspaper articles, compiled a list of addresses of their independently published works, and finally reported on his sources. He used the material of the previous bibliographers carefully, and for the newer literature he adapted to the data of museum books, newspapers, magazines, obituaries, and CVs.

Reprint 

The work also has a reprint (Association of Hungarian Publishers and Distributors, Veszprém, 1981) and an electronic edition courtesy of the Hungarian Electronic Library.

Order of volumes

Sources 
 Magyar katolikus lexikon I–XV. Főszerk. Diós István; szerk. Viczián János. Budapest: Szent István Társulat. 1993–2010. Magyar írók élete és munkái
 Petrik Géza: Magyar könyvészet 1886–1910, Budapest, 1913–1928 , 
 Pintér Jenőː A magyar irodalom története: tudományos rendszerezés, I–VIII. kötet, Budapest, 1930–1941. (elektronikus elérésː http://mek.oszk.hu/15300/15384/index.phtml)
 

Hungarian encyclopedias